The Fear is a five-part television drama produced for Thames Television by its subsidiary company Euston Films.

Transmitted on ITV in 1988, The Fear is the story of Carl Galton (Iain Glen), the enterprising leader of a criminal gang running a protection racket in North London. Young and ambitious, Galton represents a new breed of criminal who seeks to expand his underworld empire and takes on the old East End firms.
1980's materialism clashes with old school London villainy as Galton rises to power, yet his ruthlessness carries a personal cost, especially on his wife Linda and best friend Marty.

Cast
 Iain Glen – Carl Galton
 Susannah Harker – Linda
 Anthony Valentine – Tony Slater
 Jesse Birdsall – Marty
 Jerome Flynn – Freddie
 Fergus Brazier – Nicky
 Mario Kalli – Mario
 Denis Lill – George Klein
 Adrian Dunbar – Con
 Linda Marlowe – Pat Klein

Home media
The Fear is available on DVD in the UK through a DVD release from Network. The set includes audio commentaries on two of the five episodes from lead actor Iain Glen, 
producer Jacky Stoller and director Stuart Orme.

References

External links
 

1980s British drama television series
ITV television dramas
1980s British crime television series
1980s British television miniseries
1988 British television series debuts
1988 British television series endings
Television shows produced by Thames Television
Television series by Euston Films
Television series by Fremantle (company)
Television shows set in London
English-language television shows